Albert Torrens (born 1 July 1976) is an Australian former professional rugby league footballer who played in the 1990s and 2000s.

Playing career
Torrens made his first grade debut for Manly in Round 1 1998 against Brisbane.  In 1999, Torrens finished as joint top try scorer along with Steve Menzies.  Torrens scored a hat-trick for Manly in the club's final game against St George before merging with arch rivals North Sydney to form the Northern Eagles.

Torrens played with the Northern Eagles for the 3 seasons they were in the competition.  After the dissolution of the club, Torrens joined Manly-Warringah once again and played with them up until the end of 2004.  In 2005, Torrens joined St George and played one season with them before retiring.

Post playing
Since retiring from competitive rugby, Torrens has worked as an Indigenous outreach worker for Mission Australia. In 2009 and 2010, he studied indigenous community health at Curtin University in Western Australia.

References

1976 births
Living people
Australian rugby league players
Australian expatriate sportspeople in England
Bundjalung people
Huddersfield Giants players
Indigenous Australian rugby league players
Manly Warringah Sea Eagles players
Northern Eagles players
Rugby league centres
Rugby league players from Casino, New South Wales
Rugby league wingers
St. George Illawarra Dragons players